Marcellus Martin "Mike" McMichael (July 4, 1915 – November 13, 1997) was an American professional basketball player. He played for the Akron Goodyear Wingfoots in the National Basketball League during the 1938–39 season and averaged 3.9 points per game.

References

1915 births
1997 deaths
Akron Goodyear Wingfoots players
American men's basketball players
Basketball players from Des Moines, Iowa
Guards (basketball)
Northwestern Wildcats men's basketball players
Theodore Roosevelt High School (Iowa) alumni